The 2019 Poker Masters was the third season of the Poker Masters. It took place from November 4-14, 2019, from the PokerGO Studio at ARIA Resort & Casino in Las Vegas, Nevada. The event was sponsored by Poker Central, and every final table was streamed on PokerGO. There were ten events on the schedule including five No-Limit Hold'em, two Pot-Limit Omaha, and then a Short Deck, 8-Game, and Big Bet Mix. Buy-ins ranged from $10,000 to the $50,000 Main Event.

The Main Event was won by America's Sam Soverel, and he also won the Poker Masters Purple Jacket.

Schedule 
The schedule for the 2019 Poker Masters included five No-Limit Hold'em tournaments, two Pot-Limit Omaha tournaments, and a Short Deck event. New additions to the schedule from the 2018 Poker Masters included an 8-Game Mix tournament and Big Bet Mix. 8-Game is a rotation of H.O.R.S.E., No-Limit Hold'em, Pot-Limit Omaha, and 2-7 Triple Draw. Big Bet Mix is a rotation of No-Limit Hold'em, Pot-Limit Omaha, and No-Limit 2-7 Single Draw.

Each event lasted two days, with the first day ending once the final table was down to six players. Those players returned the next day to resume play with the action streamed on PokerGO.

Purple Jacket standings 
The 2019 Poker Masters awarded the Purple Jacket to the player that accumulated the most points during the series. American Sam Soverel won two events and cashed seven times on his way to accumulating $1,396,800 in winnings. Soverel accumulated 1,160 points and was awarded the Purple Jacket.

Results

Event #1: $10,000 No-Limit Hold'em 

 2-Day Event: November 4-5, 2019
 Number of Entrants: 97
 Total Prize Pool: $970,000
 Number of Payouts: 14
 Winning Hand:

Event #2: $10,000 Pot-Limit Omaha 

 2-Day Event: November 5-6, 2019
 Number of Entrants: 62
 Total Prize Pool: $620,000
 Number of Payouts: 9
 Winning Hand:

Event #3: $10,000 Short Deck 

 2-Day Event: November 6-7, 2019
 Number of Entrants: 37
 Total Prize Pool: $370,000
 Number of Payouts: 6
 Winning Hand:

Event #4: $10,000 8-Game Mix 

 2-Day Event: November 7-8, 2019
 Number of Entrants: 45
 Total Prize Pool: $450,000
 Number of Payouts: 7
 Winning Hand: (Pot-Limit Omaha)

Event #5: $10,000 Big Bet Mix 

 2-Day Event: November 8-9, 2019
 Number of Entrants: 52
 Total Prize Pool: $520,000
 Number of Payouts: 8
 Winning Hand:  (No-Limit Hold'em)

Event #6: $25,000 No-Limit Hold'em 

 2-Day Event: November 9-10, 2019
 Number of Entrants: 51
 Total Prize Pool: $1,275,000
 Number of Payouts: 8
 Winning Hand:

Event #7: $25,000 Pot-Limit Omaha 

 2-Day Event: November 10-11, 2019
 Number of Entrants: 34
 Total Prize Pool: $850,000
 Number of Payouts: 5
 Winning Hand:

Event #8: $10,000 No-Limit Hold'em 

 2-Day Event: November 11-12, 2019
 Number of Entrants: 41
 Total Prize Pool: $1,025,000
 Number of Payouts: 6
 Winning Hand:

Event #9: $25,000 No-Limit Hold'em 

 2-Day Event: November 12-13, 2019
 Number of Entrants: 49
 Total Prize Pool: $1,225,000
 Number of Payouts: 7
 Winning Hand:

Event #10: $50,000 No-Limit Hold'em 

 2-Day Event: November 13-14, 2019
 Number of Entrants: 34
 Total Prize Pool: $1,700,000
 Number of Payouts: 5
 Winning Hand:

References 
2019 in poker
2019 in sports in Nevada

External links 

 Results

Poker tournaments
Television shows about poker